The Sony ILCE-QX1 is a mobile device mountable, Wi-Fi-controlled, lens-type compact camera manufactured by Sony and was announced on 3 September 2014. Part of the Sony α family, it is one of Sony's "Smart Lens" cameras, alongside the QX10, QX30 and QX100, that are designed to be specifically used with a smartphone. It has a 20.1 megapixel APS-C-size sensor, uses an interchangeable E-mount lens as its highlight feature, supports power zoom but no in-body image stabilization, and has a pop-up flash unlike its other QX siblings.

Features

On the ILCE-QX1 itself, there are buttons for on/off, flash pop-up, lens release and shutter, which are enough for standalone shooting. But due to its lens-style design, the camera module requires an iOS or Android device, connected through the camera's Wi-Fi via the Imaging Edge (formerly PlayMemories) Mobile application, to utilize the device's screen as its viewfinder and camera controls, while also serving as additional storage medium via its integrated wireless file transfer feature.

The ILCE-QX1 allows capture in RAW format, but RAW files can only be directly wirelessly transferred to Android devices, not, as of September 2014, to iOS.Video capture is possible in Full HD at 30 fps, and battery life for still capture is rated at 440 shots.

See also
List of Sony E-mount cameras
Sony QX series
Sony ILCE camera
Olympus Air

References

External links

Products introduced in 2014
ILCE-QX1
QX1